Kevin Isa Luna (born 18 April 2001) is an Argentine professional footballer who plays as a winger for Atlético Tucumán.

Career
Isa started his career in the system of Atlético Tucumán. He was picked on the substitutes bench for a Primera División match with Aldosivi on 31 March 2019 by manager Ricardo Zielinski, who subsequently selected the winger to come on after eighty-five minutes - in place of David Barbona during a 1–0 home win.

Career statistics
.

References

External links

2001 births
Living people
Place of birth missing (living people)
Argentine people of Palestinian descent
Argentine footballers
Association football forwards
Argentine Primera División players
Atlético Tucumán footballers